Seth David Schoen (born September 27, 1979) is senior staff technologist for the Electronic Frontier Foundation, a technology civil rights organisation, and has been actively involved in discussing digital copyright law and encryption since the 1990s. He is an expert in trusted computing.

In February 2008, Schoen collaborated with a Princeton research group led by Edward Felten that discovered a vulnerability of DRAM that undermined the basic assumptions of computer encryption security.  In October 2005, Schoen led a small research team at EFF to decode the tiny tracking dots hidden in the printouts of some laser printers.

Seth attended Northfield Mount Hermon School in Northfield, Massachusetts from 1993–1997. While attending UC Berkeley, Schoen founded Californians for Academic Freedom to protest the loyalty oath the state made university employees swear. Schoen later worked for Linuxcare, where he developed the Linuxcare Bootable Business Card. After he left Linuxcare, he forked the project to create the LNX-BBC rescue system, of which he is a lead developer. Schoen was formerly a board member and the Secretary of the Peer-Directed Projects Center, a Texas-based non-profit corporation, until he stepped down in November 2006.

Schoen is the author of the DeCSS haiku.

References

External links 
 Personal homepage
 Vitanuova, Seth's weblog
   
 DeCSS haiku
 The History of the DeCSS Haiku
 Californians for Academic Freedom (archived)

1979 births
American bloggers
Copyright activists
Living people
Northfield Mount Hermon School alumni
University of California, Berkeley alumni
21st-century American non-fiction writers